The name Andrea has been used for two tropical cyclones and two subtropical cyclones worldwide.

In the Atlantic Ocean:
Subtropical Storm Andrea (2007) – Formed near Florida, curved to the north, bringing rain to portions of the Southeast United States.
Tropical Storm Andrea (2013) – Made landfall in Florida, killing three, and causing minor damage.
Subtropical Storm Andrea (2019) – Weak and short-lived subtropical storm which meandered over the western Atlantic. 

In the Indian Ocean:
Cyclone Andrea (1970) – Remained out at sea

Atlantic hurricane set index articles
South-West Indian Ocean cyclone set index articles